Ludmírov is  a municipality and village in Prostějov District in the Olomouc Region of the Czech Republic. It has about 500 inhabitants.

Administrative parts
Villages of Dětkovice, Milkov, Ospělov and Ponikev are administrative parts of Ludmírov.

References

Villages in Prostějov District